Umetbayevo (Ömötbay) is a rural locality (a village) in Saraysinsky Selsoviet, Sterlibashevsky District, Bashkortostan, Russia. The population was 113 as of 2010. There are 4 streets.

Geography 
Umetbayevo is located 43 km southeast of Sterlibashevo (the district's administrative centre) by road. Yelmbetovo is the nearest rural locality.

References 

Rural localities in Sterlibashevsky District